Albatross is the seventh novel by Canadian author Terry Fallis.  It was published in August 2019.  It earned a place on The Globe and Mails bestseller list a week after publication.

Plot

Hero Adam Coryell unexpectedly finds himself to be a golf prodigy.  Unfortunately he wants to be a writer, and he hates golf.

Reviews

The Globe and Mails review asserted "This novel has a fable-like quality and philosophical depths that Fallis plumbs with a deceptive subtlety – you’ll come for the story about an athletic whiz kid, and leave contemplating where true happiness really lies, both in Adam’s life and your own.".

References

2019 Canadian novels
McClelland & Stewart books
Novels about golf